Yevgeny Eduardovich Gapon (born 20 April 1991) is a Russian professional footballer.

Career
He made his debut in the Russian Premier League on 3 April 2009 for FC Khimki in a game against FC Rostov.

In January 2015, Gapon went on trial with CSKA Moscow.

On 13 May 2021, he signed with Kazakhstan Premier League club FC Shakhter Karagandy.

References

External links
 
 

1991 births
Sportspeople from Novosibirsk
Living people
Russian footballers
Russia youth international footballers
Russia under-21 international footballers
Association football defenders
FC Khimki players
FC Shinnik Yaroslavl players
FC Fakel Voronezh players
FC Mordovia Saransk players
FC Kuban Krasnodar players
FC Anzhi Makhachkala players
FC Shakhter Karagandy players
FC Tekstilshchik Ivanovo players
Russian Premier League players
Russian First League players
Russian Second League players
Kazakhstan Premier League players
Russian expatriate footballers
Expatriate footballers in Kazakhstan
FC Urozhay Krasnodar players
FC Sportakademklub Moscow players